Brandon Cavitt (born March 28, 1973 in Stockton, California) is a retired U.S. soccer midfielder who spent five seasons in the  USISL, one in the Continental Indoor Soccer League, one in the World Indoor Soccer League and one in the Major Indoor Soccer League.

Youth
In 1992, Cavitt began his collegiate career at Sonoma State University.  In the summer of 1993, he transferred to Sacramento State University where he played from 1993 to 1995.  His seventeen career assists puts him tied for the school record.  He was inducted into the school’s Athletic Honor Roll in 2005.  He graduated in 2003 with a bachelor's degree in English.

Professional
In 1992, Cavitt joined with the expansion San Francisco All Blacks of the USISL as an amateur player.  He spent each collegiate off seasons with San Francisco through the 1995 season.  In February 1996, the Dallas Burn selected Cavitt in the third round (twenty-eighth overall) of the 1996 MLS College Draft.  The Burn waived him on March 26, 1996 during a pre-season roster reduction.  He then returned to Northern California where he played for the Sacramento Scorpions of the USISL.  He moved to the Sacramento Knights of the Continental Indoor Soccer League for the 1997 summer indoor season.  In 1998, he played for the St. Louis Storm in the USISL A-League but returned to the Knights in 1999, playing for them through the 2001 season.  In 1999, the Knights played in the World Indoor Soccer League, winning the league title.  The Dallas Sidekicks selected Cavitt with the 15th pick of the 2002 MISL Dispersal Draft.  He signed with Dallas on February 6, 2003 and played seven games with them during the 2003-2004 season.

References

External links
Cavitt bio
  Dallas Sidekicks bio

1973 births
Living people
American soccer players
Continental Indoor Soccer League players
Dallas Sidekicks (2001–2008 MISL) players
New Orleans Riverboat Gamblers players
Sacramento Knights players
Sacramento Scorpions players
Sacramento State Hornets men's soccer players
San Francisco United All Blacks players
USISL players
World Indoor Soccer League players
USL League Two players
USISL Select League players
A-League (1995–2004) players
FC Dallas draft picks
Association football midfielders
Soccer players from California